Wisam Nawar (born 14 February 1990) is an Egyptian handball player for Zamalek and the Egyptian national team.

He represented Egypt at the World Men's Handball Championship in 2015, 2019, and 2021

References

1990 births
Living people
Egyptian male handball players
Olympic handball players of Egypt
Handball players at the 2020 Summer Olympics
21st-century Egyptian people